Sarangesa tertullianus, commonly known as the blue-dusted elfin, is a species of butterfly in the family Hesperiidae. It is found in Guinea, Sierra Leone, Liberia, Ivory Coast, Ghana, Togo, Nigeria, Cameroon, Gabon, the Republic of the Congo, the Democratic Republic of the Congo and Uganda (from the western part of the country to Bwamba). The habitat consists of forest edges and secondary growth near forests.

Adult males are attracted to flowers and bird droppings and mud-puddle.

References

Butterflies described in 1793
Celaenorrhinini